Ridgeland High School is a suburban public high school located in Ridgeland, Mississippi, United States.

In addition to the city of Ridgeland, it serves the Madison County portion of Jackson, which includes the faculty housing for Tougaloo College.

Notable alumni
Bianca Knight, Olympic track and field athlete

References

External links
 

2002 establishments in Mississippi
Educational institutions established in 2002
Public high schools in Mississippi
Schools in Madison County, Mississippi